Shaheed (Martyr) Corporal Hussain Adam, was a Maldivian soldier who died while defending the Maldives National Defence Force headquarters, during the  1988 Maldives coup d'état attempt on 3 November 1988. His heroic actions that day was one of the key reasons why the insurgents failed to breach the main gate of MNDF.  His immediate response and actions that day, played a pivotal role in defending the Headquarters from a surprising attack at the dawn.

At the early dawn of 3 November 1988, Corporal Hussain Adam was posted to one of the two outdoor security posts responsible for the security of the main gate of MNDF Headquarters. When the insurgents approached to take over the building, he immediately responded shooting at the insurgents who had planned for a surprise attack at dawn. His response was the initial counter attack from the Headquarters. He held them back until he succumbed to the firing after his bullets ran empty. This gave the soldiers inside the Headquarters sufficient time to prepare for a counter attack. He eventually ran out of bullets, but kept demanding for extra magazines till his death.

Today, Martyr Hussain Adam is considered one of the national heroes of Maldives, for his presence of mind and his courage during the terrorist attacks of 3 November 1988.

References

Maldivian military personnel
People from Malé
1968 births
1988 deaths
People from Kulhudhuffushi